Newlands Girls' School is a girls' secondary school and sixth form located in Maidenhead, Berkshire, England.

History
It was founded as Maidenhead High School in 1905 by its first Headmistress, Mary Burn, moved to The Castle Hill Centre (then called The Elms) in 1907 and in 1959 moved to Farm Road, where it still stands today.

The school was renamed Newlands School in 1973 when it converted to comprehensive schooling. In September 1999 the school became a community school and was renamed to Newlands Girls' School. In 2002 the school achieved the status of a Technology College and the Sportsmark Award. In 2004 it was then awarded the Artsmark Award. The school celebrated its centenary in 2005 after being established for 100 years.

In October 2015 Newlands Girls' School converted to academy status.

References

External links
Newlands Girls' School

Girls' schools in Berkshire
Secondary schools in the Royal Borough of Windsor and Maidenhead
Academies in the Royal Borough of Windsor and Maidenhead
Training schools in England
Educational institutions established in 1905
1905 establishments in England